Abraxas stresemanni is a species of moth belonging to the family Geometridae. It was described by Rothschild in 1915. It is known from Ceram.

References

Abraxini
Moths of Indonesia
Moths described in 1915